Biberach is a municipality in the district of Ortenau in Baden-Württemberg in Germany.

Mayors 

 1892–1904: Gustav Isidor Schweiß
 1904–1913: Josef Ringwald
 1913–1921: Gustav Karl Schweiß
 1921–1923: Franz Xaver Jehle
 1924–1930: Leonhard Willmann
 1930–1935: Josef Himmelsbach
 1935–1943: Dr. Theodor Seiberlich
 1943–1946: Johann Dürrholder
 1946–1953: Hermann Kühn
 1953–1974: Karl Allgeier
 1974–1998: Wolfgang Bösinger
 1998–2014: Hans Peter Heizmann
 2014–2022: Daniela Paletta
 since 2022: Jonas Breig

References

Ortenaukreis